The 1921–22 Luxembourg Cup was the first edition of Luxembourg's knockout football tournament.  It began with the First Round on 4 September 1921 and concluded with the Final on 21 May 1922.  Racing Club Luxembourg defeated Jeunesse Esch 2-0 in the Final.

First round

The matches were played on 4 September 1921.

|}

Notes
Note 1:  Match was won by forfeit.

Second round

The matches were played on 2 October 1921.  Stade Dudelange received a bye into the Third Round.

|}

Notes
Note 2:  Match was won by forfeit.

Third round

The Third Round matches were played on 6 November 1921.  US Rumelange received a bye into the Fourth Round.

|}

Notes
Note 3:  Match was won by forfeit.

Fourth round

The Fourth Round was played on 5 February 1922.

|}

Semifinals 

The Semifinal was played on 2 April 1922.  Racing Club Luxembourg received a bye to the Final.

|}

Final 

The Final was played on 21 May 1922.

|}

External links 

 http://www.fussball-lux.lu/ (German)

Luxembourg Cup seasons
1921–22 domestic association football cups
Luxembourg Cup